Hunter Taverner Hillenmeyer (born October 28, 1980) is a former American football linebacker in the National Football League (NFL). He was drafted by the Green Bay Packers in the fifth round of the 2003 NFL Draft and played for the Chicago Bears from 2003 to 2010. Hillenmeyer attended high school at Montgomery Bell Academy and played college football at Vanderbilt University.

He is a columnist for TheStreet.com.

Early years 
Growing up in Nashville, Hillenmeyer attended Harding Academy before moving onto Montgomery Bell Academy (MBA). Hillenmeyer was a two-time All-state, All-region and All-district selection at Montgomery Bell Academy playing linebacker, defensive end, tight end and punter for the Big Red, including the school's 1998 state championship team. He lettered 3 years in football, 3 years in track and 2 years in tennis.

College career 
Hillenmeyer was a four-year letterwinner at Vanderbilt (1999–2002) where he saw action in 45 games, starting the final 23 (every contest from 2000–02) and tallying 249 tackles (165 solos) and 6.5 sacks. As a senior, Hillenmeyer was 1 of 6 Division I-A football National Scholar-Athletes earned First-team All-SEC and First-team Academic All-America honors while leading nation in tackles per game (14.0).

Professional career 
Hillenmeyer signed with the Chicago Bears after being cut by the Green Bay Packers at the end of the 2003 preseason. Hillenmeyer spent most of 2003 playing special teams for the Bears, he tied for fifth on Chicago with 12 special teams tackles as a rookie, playing 13 games on special teams. He became the starter at strong side linebacker in 2004 starting 11 games while appearing in all 16 and making 90 tackles and 2.5 sacks. In 2005, he had 71 tackles including 5 TFLs, 1 sack, 1 INT and 2 PBUs while starting 12 of the first 13 games at SLB before a thumb injury sidelined him for the final three regular season games.

On June 30, 2006, the Bears signed Hillenmeyer to a five-year, $13 million contract extension through 2010 that included a $5 million signing bonus. That season, he started 13 games at strongside linebacker, finishing with 68 tackles, 2 TFLs, 1 fumble recovery and a career-high 3 PBUs. In 2007, he played in all 16 games for the second time in his career, starting a career-high 14 contests and had a career-high 101 tackles, and registered 5 QB Hits, 3 TFLs, 2 PBUs, 1 forced fumble and 1 fumble recovery. In 2008, Hillenmeyer played 13 games, starting six. Along with All-Pro linebackers Brian Urlacher and Lance Briggs, the Bears were thought to have one of the best linebacking corps in the league; the Chicago Sun-Times called Hillenmeyer "underrated". In announcing the defensive starters for a 2006 Monday Night Football game against the St. Louis Rams, Bears teammate Alex Brown nicknamed the linebacker "Triple H Hunter Hillenmeyer".

Hillenmeyer replaced Brian Urlacher at middle linebacker for the Bears after Urlacher's season-ending wrist injury in Week 1 of the 2009 season, making 90 tackles, 2.5 sacks, 1 interception and forcing four fumbles.

On September 14, 2010, Hillenmeyer was placed on the Bears injured reserve list after sustaining a severe concussion in the team's season opener against the Detroit Lions. He was released by the Bears on February 28, 2011.

Personal life 
Hillenmeyer pursued a Part-Time MBA program at the Kellogg School of Management at Northwestern University in Evanston, Illinois. An interview with Fox News Chicago revealed that Hillenmeyer is married to the daughter of Tim Floyd, former coach of the Iowa State, Chicago Bulls, and Southern California men's basketball teams. Hillenmeyer's father is a chef and restaurant owner in Tennessee.

In 2013, Hillenmeyer founded a company called OverDog, which allows fans to compete against pro athletes in video games over a mobile app.

References

External links

1980 births
American football linebackers
Chicago Bears players
Living people
Players of American football from Nashville, Tennessee
Vanderbilt Commodores football players
Kellogg School of Management alumni